Aisha Gray Henry, also known as Virginia Gray Henry, is an American writer, Islamic scholar, filmmaker and editor.

Biography

Gray Henry earned her B.A. in art history and world religions from Sarah Lawrence College and her M.A in education from the University of Michigan. She also studied for ten years at Al-Azhar.

In 1981, she helped to establish the Islamic Texts Society in Cambridge. 

She is the founder and director of the Islamic publishing house Fons Vitae. Grey Henry and Fons Vitae have worked on making the works of al-Ghazali accessible to children. In 2006, Gray Henry arranged for an interfaith meeting between the Dalai Lama and Muslim scholars. 

She is an art historian and scholar of religion who taught at the Dalton School, Fordham and Cambridge Universities. Gray Henry is a co-founder and board member of the Thomas Merton Center Foundation where she arranges meetings on the works of Thomas Merton.

Filmography
Beads of Faith: Pathways to Meditation and Spirituality Using Rosaries, Prayer Beads and Sacred Words available as a book and film.
Islam: A Pictorial Essay 
Cairo: 1001 Years of Art and Architecture
Death and Transformation: The Personal Reflections of Huston Smith
The Ornaments of Lhasa: Islam in Tibet

Works
Understanding Islam and the Muslims
The Life of the Prophet Mohammad, credited as Aisha Governeur with Leila Azzam
Water: Its Spiritual Significance, edited by Elena Lloyd-Sidle and Virginia Gray Henry Blakemore
Contributor to Fons Vitae Thomas Merton Series
Contributor to Praeger series, Voices of Islam

References

External links
 Fons Vitae Publishing House

Year of birth missing (living people)
Living people
Converts to Islam
American Muslims
American filmmakers
Traditionalist School
American Sufis
Sufi writers
Women scholars of Islam
University of Michigan alumni